The Brampton Board of Trade is a business organization founded in Brampton, Ontario, in 1887.  It engages in government lobbying, member discounts, and networking. It previously organized the Brampton Santa Claus Parade (1985-2017).

Joe Spina served as an Ontario MPP from 1999 to 2003, after his time as BBOT President.

The Board's archival fonds is at the Region of Peel Archives, with records from 1909 to 1919 and 1947 to 1973.

History

 1887 - founded and lapsed shortly after election of officers
 1890 - founded
 1897 - ceases operations
 1903 - founded
 1921, 1923–1947 - dormant
 1947 - revived as Brampton Chamber of Commerce
 1964 - amends name to Brampton and District Chamber of Commerce
1974 - The Regional Government was formed and re-incorporated as The Brampton Board of Trade.  Operated the motor vehicle licensing bureau from 1974-2015.
1985 - Revived the Santa Claus Parade as a nationally acclaimed night parade.
1997 - Won Ontario Chamber of Commerce award for communications.
 1997 - Welcomed Maria Britto as the first female president.
2000 - Assisted with the recruitment of Chrysler, Brampton’s largest employer at the time.
2004 - Successfully advocated for the extension of Highway 410 through Brampton.
2004 - Launched the “Save Our Hospital” campaign and continued healthcare advocacy for Peel Memorial.
2014 - International trade advocacy and market development are supported by the mission to Turkey.
2015 - Launched the Prosperity Roundtable and agenda to boost key economic drivers.
2015 - Became a founding member of Canadian Global Cities Council, a coalition of business communities in Canada’s nine largest markets.
2016 - Recognized as #1 business association and networking organization in Brampton.
2016 - Became a founding member of Canada’s Innovation Corridor Business Council.
2017 - Joined World Trade Centre – Toronto’s first mission to the United Arab Emirates.
2017 - Established Top 40 Under 40 initiative to showcase Brampton’s talented workforce.
2018 - Successfully advocated for reducing city property tax increases (frozen 2018-2020).
2019 - Re-accredited with the standard of excellence by the national accreditation council (with distinction). 
2019 - Hosted Chamber Executives of Ontario Conference.
2019 - CEO Todd Letts was named to Governing Council, World Chambers Federation of the International Chamber of Commerce.
2020 - Collaborated with Mayor’s Task Force on Economic Recovery to provide essential business guidance through global pandemic.
2020 - Advocated for Two-Way, All-Day GO train service which led to our CEO’s appointment to the Minister of Transportation’s Business Advisory Council on Transit in the Innovation Corridor.
2021 - The Brampton Board of Trade held the 4th Annual Canada's Innovation Corridor Summit, exploring key issues associated with the theme of Disruption.
2022 - The Brampton Board of Trade was selected to host the Ontario Chamber of Commerce's 2022 AGM & Convention. This event represents one of the most significant opportunities for business leaders from across the province to network with peers, debate Ontario business policy issues, and shape our future advocacy agenda.

Programs

Speakers 

The organization has hosted many notable speakers, most recently hosting Party leaders prior to the 2022 Provincial election: Steven Del Duca (Ontario Liberals), Mike Schreiner (Green Party of Ontario) and Andrea Horwath (Ontario NDP).  Each February, the Board of Trade hosts the State of the City, where the Mayor of Brampton and Chair of the Board share their priorities for the year ahead. As part of the View from the Top series, Brampton Board of Trade CEO Todd Letts spoke with Dr. Mohamed Lachemi Professor, President and Vice-Chancellor at Ryerson University on October 21, 2021.  In April 2021, Todd Letts and Chair Michelle McCollum hosted Joe Jackman and Bob Peacock of Almag Aluminum to speak about succession planning and overcoming adversity and business challenges.  The Board also hosts Minister visits, hosting the Honourable Steve Clark Minister of Municipal Affairs and Housing, who was joined by the Honourable Prabmeet Sarkaria and MPP Amarjot Sandhu, Parliamentary Assistant to the Minister of Infrastructure on October 27. 2021, prior to that they hosted the Honourable Omar Alghabra, Minister of Transport on April 29th, 2021.  They have previously hosted federal Small Business Minister Tony Abbott, Chrysler Canada CEO Reid Bigland, Ontario Premier Bill Davis, Canadian Alliance party leader Stockwell Day (who announced a timetable for merging with Progressive Conservative party), Prime Minister Stephen Harper, Ontario Premier Mike Harris, Chrysler Canada president Yves Landry, Reform Party leader Preston Manning, Ontario Minister of Agriculture William "Bill" Newman, Minister of Small Business and Export Promotion Mary Ng, Ontario Premier David Peterson, federal Agriculture Minister Eugene Whelan, and Minister of Finance Michael Wilson.

Policy positions 

The Board supported the Charlottetown Accord (1992).

The Brampton Board of Trade supports regional public transit infrastructure, including extending the Hazel McCallion (formerly Hurontario) Line north onto Main Street in Brampton and the full implementation of Two-Way, All Day GO (TWADG) Train service.  

The Brampton Board of Trade supports building the GTA West Transportation Corridor, better known as Highway 413. 

The Brampton Board of Trade supports increasing the footprint of the post-secondary sector in Brampton. This includes augmenting current offerings (such as those of Algoma University, Sheridan College and Toronto Metropolitan University) as well as pursuing new opportunities (such as the relocation of the University of Guelph-Humber campus). 

The Brampton Board of Trade supports efforts to increase uptake of COVID-19 vaccines, including on-site vaccination clinics at major industrial employers at the height of the pandemic. 

The Brampton Board of Trade supports the implementation of affordable childcare. 

The Brampton Board of Trade supports urgent solutions to the crisis in the housing market, including interventions such as ending exclusionary zoning to build the “missing middle” by increasing the supply of multi-unit complexes in areas not zoned for them. 

The Brampton Board of Trade supports an engaging municipal budget process that includes proactive stakeholder consultation, as well as disclosure of relevant documents related to capital expenditures and capital planning well in advance. The Board has also taken the position that longer-range capital forecasting will strengthen the city’s hand in competing for capital funding from senior orders of government. 

The Brampton Board of Trade supports the investment necessary to complete and fully unlock the potential of Riverwalk. 

The Brampton Board of Trade supports increasing the number of immigrants admitted under given categories based on workforce needs, and has called on government to work together to more quickly recognize international credentials in fields experiencing labour shortages in Ontario. 

The Brampton Board of Trade has called on the federal and provincial governments to work together to break down barriers to interprovincial trade, and has called on the federal government to redouble efforts to secure free trade agreements with emerging economies such as India.

Brampton Santa Claus Parade 

Brampton's Santa Claus parade stopped in the mid-1970s. In 1985, the Brampton Board of Trade started planning a Santa Claus parade for 1986; simultaneously, the Jaycees were intending to start a parade in 1987. With City co-operation, the Board's parade launched in 1986, with Jaycee assistance in marshalling. That year's program was announced to include forty community entrants, sponsored by companies, but ended up with 52 units. In recent years, it has included over 100 units. The parade moved to a "night parade" format in 1995.

The parade route has expanded from Vodden to south of Wellington Street (1986) to Sproule to south of Elgin Street.

The parade typically happens a week before the Toronto Santa Claus Parade.

The Board claims an in-person attendance of 160,000 (2012). It claims to be the largest single-day event in the Regional Municipality of Peel, and the largest night parade in Canada. The Canadian Chamber of Commerce has named the parade as the Best Community Lighted Parade in Canada.

The program was broadcast on Rogers TV Brampton, which claimed viewership of over 250,000 between live and repeat broadcasts.

The Board of Trade stopped hosting the parade in 2017, and it is now run by the Lions Club of Brampton.

People

Chairpersons of the BBOT 
From 1887 to 2011, Chairs were referred to as Presidents of the BBOT.

 1887, K. Chisholm
 1890–1896, E.O. Runians
 1904–1906, John H. Boulter
 1906–1907, T.W. Duggan, later mayor (from Dale Estates Limited)
 1907, E.S. Anderson
 1907–1911, G.L. Williams
 1911–1914, John H. Boulter
 1914–1917, R.H. Pringle
 1917–1919, F. W. Wegenast, later mayor
 1919–1920, G.W. McFarland
 1922, James Martin
 1948–1949, F. Gordon Umphrey
 1950, Cecil Carscadden
 1951, William Robinson
 1952, Frank Richardson
 1953, C.G. Patterson
 1954, Joe Racine
 1955, Emerson McKinney
 1956, William Watson
 1957, William Coupar
 1958, William Robinson
 1959, Lloyd Denby
 1960, Stan Stonehouse
 1960–1961, Harold Knight
 1961–1962, Cecil Chinn
 1962–1963, Edward Ching
 1963–1964, Sam Charters
 1964–1965, Douglas Brown
 1965–1966, Gordon Vivian
 1966–1967, Stan Eisel
 1967–1968, J.A. Carroll
 1968–1969, Ronald Rider
 1969–1970, Richard Boyle
 1970–1971, R.C. Harvey
 1971–1972, Hank Sawatsky
 1972–1973, Peter Montgomery
 1973–1974, Watson Kennedy
 1974–1975, G.W. (Joe) Harley
 1975–1976, A.D.K. Mackenzie
 1976–1977, Harry Lockwood
 1977–1978, Don Crawford
 1978–1979, John Logan (from John Logan Chevrolet-Oldsmobile)
 1979–1980, Terry Champ
 1980–1981, Jim Phair
 1981–1982, Marty Hughes
 1982–1983, Earnie Mitchell
 1983–1984, Keith Coulter
 1984–1985, Bruce Carruthers
 1985–1986, Robert Bell
 1986–1987, Dennis Cole
 1987–1988, Lou Duggan
 1988–1989, Wally Rudensky
 1989–1990, Joe Spina, later an MPP
 1990–1991, Al Brannon
 1991, Lewis Wagg
 1991–1992, Jack Coughlin
 1992–1993, Jim Inglis
 1993–1994, Paul Howlett
 1994–1995, Blaine Mitton
 1995–1996, Bob Nutbrown
 1996–1997, Bryan Dawson
 1997–1998, Maria Britto
 1998–1999, Ken Hay
 1999–2000, Heather Picken (from Lawrence, Lawrence, Stevenson LLP)
 2000–2001, Adam Nowak
 2001–2002, John Sanderson
 2002–2003, Robert Peacock
 2003–2004, Michael Collins
 2004–2005, Mitch Robinson (from ScotiaMcLeod Inc.)
 2005–2006, Michael Luchenski (from Lawrence, Lawrence, Stevenson LLP)
 2006–2007, Wayne Waters
 2007–2008, Linda Ford
 2008–2009, Carman McClelland
 2009–2010, F-Charles Waud (from WaudWare Incorporated)
 2010–2011, Stephen Rhodes
 2012, Jim Schembri
 2013, Glenn Williams
 2014, Susan Crawford
 2015, Jaipaul Massey-Singh
 2016, Badar Shamim
 2017, Evan Moore
 2018, Heather Strati
2019, Manpreet Mann
2020, Vanessa White
2021, Donna Fagon-Pascal

Brampton Business Person of the Year 

 1978: Emerson McKinney
 1979: Charles Armstrong
 1980: William Pickett
 1981: Carl Dalli
 1982: Max Rice
 1983: G.W. (Joe) Harley
 1984: Marie and Joseph Colbacchin
 1985: John Logan
 1986: John Mills
 1987: David Dickson M.D.
 1988: Harry Lockwood
 1989: Donald Crawford
 1990: Robert Bell
 1991: Ruth Sharpe
 1992: Jeff Kerbel
 1993: John Cutruzzola
 1994: Al Brannon
 1995: Bill Graham
 1996: Lou Duggan
 1997: Bob May
 1998: Roger Peddle
 1999: Ignat Kaneff
 2000: Mike Cuttle
 2001: Chris Butcher
 2002: Maria Britto
 2003: John Sanderson
 2004: Bryan Dawson
 2005: Bill Strachan
 2006: Scott Goodison
 2007: Neil Davis
 2008: George Chiu
 2009: Doug Munro
 2010: Vlad Stritesky
 2011: Rob Filken
 2012: Linda Ford
 2013: David Sharpe
 2014–15: Bob Peacock
 2016: Heather Picken
 2017: Mohamad Fakih
 2018: Robert Bedard<
 2019: Richard Prouse, lawyer, Prouse, Dash & Crouch, LLP
 2020: William E. Johnston, Bramgate Automotive Inc. president
2021: Vito Ciciretto, President & CEO, Dynacare
2022: Heather Strati, Partner, Deloitte

Lifetime members of BBoT 
 Robert Bell
 J. Bruce Carruthers C.A.
 Keith Coulter
 Donald R. Crawford
 G.W. (Joe) Harley
 Harry Lockwood
 John Logan
 Ron Rider
 Peter Robertson
 Ruth Sharpe
 Gordon Smith

References

External links
 Brampton Board of Trade

Brampton
Chambers of commerce in Canada
1887 establishments in Ontario
1903 establishments in Ontario
Organizations established in 1887